Homing may refer to:

Guidance 
Guidance system, a device or group of devices used to navigate a ship, aircraft, missile, rocket, satellite, or other craft
Homing (missile guidance)
Infrared homing, a passive missile guidance system which uses the emission from a target of infrared electromagnetic radiation
Semi-active radar homing, a common type of missile guidance system for longer-range air-to-air and surface-to-air missile systems
Active radar homing, a missile guidance method in which a guided missile uses a radar transceiver to find and track its target autonomously
Homing torpedo, "fire and forget" torpedoes can use passive or active guidance
Acoustic homing, a system which uses sound to guide a moving object
Homing (biology), the inherent ability of an animal to navigate towards an original location through unfamiliar areas
Homing pigeon, a variety of domestic pigeon bred to find its way home over extremely long distances
Homing beacon, sometimes homer, a beacon that transmits a signal to be homed on

Other uses 
Homing (hematopoietic), a process of cellular migration
Homing (horse), a racehorse
Homing (mechanical), moving a mechanical system to a reference position 
Multiple homing, two types of telephone connections of a terminal facility

See also 
Bird migration
Distress radiobeacon
Honing (disambiguation)